MRD Motorsports is an American NASCAR team. The team is owned by Dave Malcolmson but has been inactive as of 2009.

Malcolmson originally started the team in the Allison Legacy Series as a driver before retiring as an owner. Malcolmson would debut his team in the Goody's Dash Series before moving up to the Truck Series in 2003. The team would field the No. 06 for Regan Smith in 2004 and 2005, with his best finish being 9th at Homestead-Miami Speedway. Smith would leave the team for the Busch Series, and Malcolmson tapped ARCA RE/MAX Series driver Chad McCumbee for the 2006 season. McCumbee and MRD struggled, missing the season opening GM Flex Fuel 250. After a few races, McCumbee left the team for Green Light Racing. The operation would run out of money after Dover. Malcolmson would revive the team for the 2007 season in a partnership with Nextel Cup Series team Haas CNC Racing. MRD fielded another ARCA driver, this time for Rookie of the Year Blake Bjorklund in 12 races because of a driver development partnership with Haas CNC Racing. However, owner Gene Haas decided to move Bjorklund up to the Busch Series to pilot Jay Robinson Racing's No. 28. Chad McCumbee would return to MRD after struggling with Green Light Racing, taking his sponsors The GPS Store and Garmin with him. His best finish with MRD was a 10th place at Las Vegas Motor Speedway. McCumbee took the team to a near upset victory at Texas before spinning his tires which led to being spun on a green-white-checkered finish and finishing 13th.

For 2009, MRD cut back to a partial schedule with Dennis Setzer driving starting at Atlanta. The team grabbed a few top tens and was sitting in the top 10 in points when was forced to miss six races due to sponsorship issues. Todd Kluever drove for the team at Gateway, but nothing has been heard of the team since.

American auto racing teams
Defunct NASCAR teams